A suspension bridge usually has main cables (else ropes or chains), anchored at each end of the bridge. Any load applied to the bridge is transformed into a tension in these main cables. The earliest suspension bridges had the cables anchored in the ground at either end of the bridge, but some modern suspension bridges anchor the cables to the ends of the bridge itself. The earliest suspension bridges had no towers or piers, but these are present in the majority of larger suspension bridges. Although the earlier types of suspension bridges are suitable only for relatively short spans, all of the 14 longest bridges in the world are suspension bridges (see List of longest suspension bridge spans). Ignoring the possibility of pre-Columbian trans-oceanic contact, there were two independent inventions of the suspension bridge, in Eurasia (probably in China) and in Central and South America.

Types
Types of suspension bridge include the following:

A pure suspension bridge is one without additional stay cables and in which the main cables are anchored in the ground.  This includes most simple suspension bridges and suspended-deck suspension bridges, and excludes self-anchored suspension bridges.

Hybrid types

Some suspension bridges are of unusual hybrid types. Among these are suspension bridges that have an "intermediate deck". These bridges have a portion of deck that resembles an underspanned suspension bridge. Some of the earliest suspended-deck suspension bridges were of this type, and they continue to be constructed. Examples constructed in the 20th century include a viaduct over the river Oberargen near Wangen, Germany. A  span of the viaduct has a cable support below the deck, with one end of the cable anchored at a pier and the other end tied into a conventional cable stay.

The Akashi Kaikyō Bridge, one of the longest suspension bridges in the world, is a suspended-deck suspension bridge with a stiff truss girder deck.  Its main span is 1,991 meters long.

Construction
Unlike many other types of bridge, suspension bridges often can be built without use of falsework. In many cases, the main cables are constructed first, then the deck is added. This often involves the use of a pilot cable. For details of their construction methods, see the articles about each type of bridge.

Provided the cables are of sufficiently high quality, suspension bridges are suitable for the longest spans. However, their construction costs are high, so that usually they are economical only for spans in excess of 1000 feet. Shorter spans often are constructed for aesthetic reasons. The economy of longer span suspension bridges is due to their relatively low weight, but because of the greater flexibility that comes with low weight these bridges are more suitable as road bridges than railroad bridges.

See also 
  (bridges made of living plants)
 Cable-stayed bridge
 Floating suspension bridge

References

External links

 "Suspension bridge" Encyclopædia Britannica

+
Bridges by structural type